Dumbrăveni is a commune in Constanța County, Northern Dobruja, Romania.

The commune includes two villages:
 Dumbrăveni (historical name: Hairanchioi)
 Furnica (historical name: Şchender)

Demographics
At the 2011 census, Dumbrăveni had 513 Romanians (99.23%), 4 others (0.77%).

References

Communes in Constanța County
Localities in Northern Dobruja